McVitie is a surname. Notable people with the surname include:

George McVitie (born 1948), English footballer
Jack McVitie (1932–1967), English mobster

See also
McVitie's, a snack food brand
McVittie